Janez Friderik Egger  was a politician of the 18th century in Slovenia, when the country was under the Holy Roman Empire. He became mayor of Ljubljana in 1782. He was succeeded by Josip Pototschnig in 1786.

References

Mayors of places in the Holy Roman Empire
Mayors of Ljubljana
Year of birth missing
Year of death missing
18th-century Carniolan people